Champlin is a surname. Notable people with the surname include:

Arthur B. Champlin (1858–?), American journalist and politician
Bill Champlin (born 1947), American rock musician
Charles Champlin (born 1926), American film critic and writer
Christopher G. Champlin (1768–1840), United States Senator from Rhode Island
Donna Lynne Champlin (born 1971), American actress and dancer
Edward Champlin, Classics professor at Princeton University
Ezra T. Champlin (1839–1928), American politician
Hallie Champlin, 1900 US national tennis champion in women's doubles
John W. Champlin (1831–1901), member of the Michigan Supreme Court, law professor and mayor of Grand Rapids
Joseph M. Champlin (1930–2008), Roman Catholic priest and author
Stephen Champlin (1789–1870), United States Navy officer during the War of 1812
Stephen G. Champlin (1827–1864), American physician, lawyer, judge and Union Army general
William A. Champlin, American politician from Mississippi
Zachary T. Champlin (1847–1924), American politician from Mississippi and son of the above